The  was the standard fragmentation hand grenade of the Imperial Japanese Army and Imperial Japanese Navy SNLF during the Second Sino-Japanese War and World War II.

History and development
The Type 97 was developed from the earlier Type 91 grenade which could also be used as a fragmentation hand grenade, but was predominantly used as munitions for the Type 10, and Type 89 grenade launchers. For this reason, it had less explosive power and a relatively longer delay time than a dedicated manual hand grenade. To address these issues, the Army Technical Bureau developed a new design in 1937. The body was painted black and the top plate red signifying an explosive charge.

Design
The Type 97 had the same principles as most fragmentation grenades of the period: a grooved "pineapple-shaped" segmented body which dispersed sharp pieces of shrapnel when it exploded. Operation was accomplished by first screwing down the firing pin, so that it protruded from the base of the striker. Then the safety pin was removed by pulling the cord to which it was attached; the protective cap which covered the striker was removed. A sharp blow against a hard surface, such as a rock, rifle stock, boot heel, or combat helmet would overcome a creep spring and crush a thin brass cap, allowing the pin to hit the primer and initiate the delay sequence before throwing at the target. However, in comparison with Allied hand grenades of the period, the explosive force of the Type 97 was weaker and, due to lack of an automatic ignition mechanism, the grenade in practice was found to be unreliable and even dangerous to use because of its erratic fuse.

Physically, the Type 97 was almost indistinguishable from the Type 91, except that it had no attachment on the base for a propellant canister. Paper labels with ink-stamped fill dates warned of the shorter, 4-5 second, delay.

Combat record
The Type 97 hand grenade was issued as standard equipment to Japanese infantrymen in the Second Sino-Japanese War and throughout the various campaigns of World War II. Even after the war ended the Type 97 grenade was used by independence movements across Southeast Asia against their European colonizers.

See also
Mills fragmentation hand grenade ("Mills bomb")
Mk. 2 fragmentation hand grenade

References

Bibliography

External links
Image of a Type 97 grenade
Details of internal construction
Taki’s Imperial Japanese Army page
US Technical Manual E 30-480

9
37
Fragmentation grenades
Hand grenades of Japan
Military equipment introduced in the 1930s